The 1988 Eagle Pro Box Lacrosse League playoffs began in March 1988 with the championship on March 20, 1988.

3 teams made the playoffs, with the Defending Champions missing the playoffs, the New Jersey saints defeated the Philadelphia Wings, in the semi-finals. then the Washington wave defeated the mnew jersey saints for their first title, this is the 2nd title given out from the league.

Playoffs

Playoff Game

Philadelphia Wings 10 @ New Jersey Saints 12

Championship

New Jersey Saints 17 @ Washington Wave 16

See also
 1988 in sports

References
1988 Archive at the Outsider's Guide to the NLL

87
Lacrosse